Cassandre Beaugrand (born 23 May 1997 in Livry-Gargan) is a French triathlete, 2014 National Elite Champion, 2013 and 2014 National Youth Champion, 2013 European Team Relay Youth Champion and 2014 Vice Junior World Champion, and 2018 until 2020 World Team Relay Champion.

From 2006 to 2011, Cassandre Beaugrand represented her hometown club Livry-Gargan Athlétisme and since then has been trained by her father Ludovic Beaugrand.
In 2012 Beaugrand joined AS Monaco Athlétisme and Saint-Raphaël Triathlon, which she left in 2014 to represent Poissy Triathlon in the prestigious French Grand Prix de Triathlon circuit. On 28 September 2014, Beaugrand took part in the Grand Final of the Club Championship Circuit in Nice and won both the individual and the club ranking, at the same time this race served as the Elite French Championship.

Since 2012, Cassandre Beaugrand has taken part in ITU competitions.
At the age of 15, she placed second at the European Championships in Aguilas (1 September 2012) in the Team Relay Youth category (16–17 years). In 2013, she won the silver medal at the French Championships (1 June 2013) in the junior category although she was still in the first year of the youth category (cadette, 16–17 years), and at the European Championships in Holten (27 June 2013) she won the gold medal in the Team Relay Youth category.
In 2014, she won her first individual gold medal at the Junior European Cup event in Quarteira (13 April 2014) and at the European Junior Championships in Kitzbuhel (20 June 2014) she placed third. At the Junior World Championships in Edmonton (29 August 2014) Beaugrand won the silver medal.

In 2013 and 2014, Beaugrand also took part in ITU Elite races although she still belonged to the Youth category: at the French Championships on 29 September 2013 she placed fourth and at the European Sprint Cup in Bratislava (18 May 2014) she won the silver medal.
At the Mixed Relay World Championships in Hamburg (13 July 2014) Beaugrand, still being in the youth category (cadette, 16–17 years), also won the silver medal in the Elite category.

In the French media, in June 2014 Beaugrand was hailed as France’s new hope for national and international triathlon events, but Beaugrand was already internationally known from 2013 on when she won the 1500m race at the EYOF (European Olympic Youth Festival) on 17 July 2013 in Utrecht.

Beaugrand is also the French 2013 and 2014 Youth Champion in cross country, and in 2013 and 2014 she also set the new national records for 1500m in her age class (youth/cadette).
On 27 October 2014 Beaugrand also set a new youth record on the 10 km distance (called semi-marathon or Voie Royale) in Saint-Denis.

Beaugrand also competes in Super League Triathlon. She finished the 2018 Championship season in 3rd place and was 8th in 2021. Beaugrand won the first Super League Triathlon Championship Series event of the 2022 Season in London, where she finished ahead of Taylor Spivey and Georgia Taylor Brown, however was eliminated from the second event, after struggling with unfavourable conditions on the bike. 

On April 23, 2022 Beaugrand set a Women's Run Record for Arena Games Triathlon racing on her way to victory at Arena Games Triathlon London 2022.

Beaugrand lives in Antibes where she is still coached by her father and in 2014/15 she attends the local Lycée Audiberti, where she will take the high school diploma in 2015 (French BAC / baccalauréat économique et social).
The local swimming club CN Antibes serves as her training base.

Beaugrand has set good times in swimming. For a 200 meter swim, her record is 2'07"25.

References

External links 

 Club Poissy Triathlon
 
 
 
 

French female triathletes
1997 births
Living people
Triathletes at the 2016 Summer Olympics
Olympic triathletes of France
Triathletes at the 2020 Summer Olympics
Medalists at the 2020 Summer Olympics
Olympic bronze medalists for France
Olympic medalists in triathlon
20th-century French women
21st-century French women